CCTV-9 is a television channel operated by Chinese state broadcaster China Central Television (CCTV), broadcasting documentaries in Mandarin Chinese. It shared the name with CCTV's English language documentary channel until 31 December 2016, when the latter was renamed CGTN Documentary.

References

External links
 

China Central Television channels
Television channels and stations established in 2011
2011 establishments in China
Documentary television channels